is the second game in the Story of Seasons series of video games, and was developed and published by Victor Interactive Software. Harvest Moon GB is the first portable Harvest Moon game, developed for the Game Boy. A Game Boy Color version was released later under the name Harvest Moon GBC. The Game Boy Color version was later released on the 3DS Virtual Console in 2013.

Gameplay
Before beginning, the player is able to choose whether to play as a girl or a boy, and name themselves. At the beginning of the game, the player's deceased grandfather visits them as a spirit and asks them to take over his farm. He implores them to succeed him as a Ranch Master, stating he will check on the player at the end of each winter to determine his progress. The player must develop their farm by growing and selling crops, and raising livestock to reach this goal. If the farm meets his criteria for you to be a Ranch Master, the player may receive extra tools; if he thinks the farm does not, a game over is given.

Crops
Crops are the primary source of income in Harvest Moon GB. Different seeds can be sown during different seasons, but any seed sown outside of its designated season will not sprout. After being planted, the seeds must be watered every day until they can be harvested. All harvested crops (along with anything able to be sold) may be put in the shipping bin to be sold. Almost all crops require active farming and maintenance, although every day, the player can harvest two Mushrooms from their underground cellar to sell.

Animals
Either a dog or a cat may be chosen as a pet. If a cat is chosen, wild dogs will not attack chickens; if a dog is picked, moles will not destroy crops. The player receives a horse early in the game, which when grown can be used for farm work, riding, and shipping items.

There are two types of livestock - cows and chickens. Cows can produce milk, which can be turned into cheese and butter, and chickens produce eggs. Both livestock can reproduce: cows by giving them Miracle Potion (equivalent to artificial insemination), and chickens by hatching their eggs.

Tools and items
There are a wide variety of tools in Harvest Moon GB. At the beginning of the game, the tools available are the axe, hoe, hammer, watering can (obtained after buying the first crop seeds), and sickle. These tools may be improved, turning into "super" tools. The player may also receive a fishing rod, pickaxe and umbrella after reaching their grandfather's goal.

Reception

Harvest Moon GB was fairly well received, earning a 7.2/10 review from Nintendo Power. GameSpot gave it a 7.4/10, saying "Harvest Moon [GB] is a relaxing and rewarding simulation of the simple life on the farm ... [but] you're better off waiting for the Game Boy Color version." IGN gave the GBC version a 6.0/10, saying "Without the dating aspects and with only a few mini-quests to play through, Harvest Moon GBC is a lightweight version of a feathery game." Total Game Boy praised the game, stating the gameplay was "extremely rewarding", praising the "certain charm" of the "childlike quality" of the game's tone.

References

1997 video games
Game Boy games
Game Boy Color games
GB
Victor Interactive Software games
Video games developed in Japan
Video games featuring protagonists of selectable gender
Pack-In-Video games
Virtual Console games
Virtual Console games for Nintendo 3DS
Single-player video games